Gabrielle Dela Merced (born June 10, 1982) better known as Gaby, is a Filipina Formula Three racecar driver, model and TV personality.

Biography 
Gabrielle “Gaby” Baltao Dela Merced (born June 10, 1982) took public interest when she became one of the few Filipinas to dominate the Asian Formula 3 circuit.  She is the only Filipina who competed in the full season of the series and her efforts to a 1st Runner-up placing in the Philippine National Formula championship.  Gaby appeared in a shampoo commercial that highlighted Filipinas with “power, brain and beauty.” According to Gaby she was willing to try any sport to join the Olympics and when she got into motor sports, she knew this was her true calling.  “Racing gives me a big sense of freedom, the world is yours, kaya mo lahat-lahat.  "She mentioned that even though she came from a broken family, she doesn't show any signs of it, because she believes "life exists to make people happy.”Aside from racing, Gaby is a bonafide sports enthusiast.  She also plays flag football and ultimate disc when she has the time.  During her younger years, she was a part of the basketball team of her school both in grade school and high school.
She has 3 older brothers and 2 younger half-sisters.

Career

Racing history 
 1999: Philippine Challenge, Championship cup
 2000: Philippine Slalom Championship, Class wins
 2001: Philippine Slalom Championship. Class wins, Ladies Champion
 2002: SVI Challenge Cup, Novice Production Class, 3rd overall
 2003: Philippine BRC Production Touring Car Championship, 3rd overall
 2003: SVI Challenge Cup, 2nd overall
 2004: Philippine Formula Toyota Championship, 3rd overall
 2004: Formula BMW Asia Scholarship Driver
 2006: Asian Formula 3 - 2nd Over-all, National Driver's Championship
 2009: 25 Hours Of Thunderhill - Finished 10th in Class-E0, and Won the Series Championship finishing the WERC

TV awards 
2007: 21st PMPC Star Awards - Best Lifestyle Show Hosts (shared with Raymond Gutierrez, Tim Yap, Issa Litton)
2008: Pinoy Big Brother Celebrity Edition 2 (3rd Big Placer)

Credits

Television

Movies
Shake,Rattle & Roll XII (2010)

Rosario (2010) -cameo (one of Rosario's friends watching in the Zarsuela scene)

References 
Gaby Dela Merced |Fans Blog

External links

PBB Profile
FHM Profile
 

1982 births
Living people
Pinoy Big Brother contestants
Filipino racing drivers
Asian Formula Three Championship drivers
Filipino female racing drivers
Formula BMW Asia drivers
Sportspeople from Manila
Star Magic